Mary Lou's Flip Flop Shop is a children's television series featuring Olympic champion gymnast Mary Lou Retton. It was created to motivate young children to believe in themselves and get moving. The show's theme song was performed by Leon Redbone. The show takes place in a wacky "Flip Flop Shop," and it features 4 "real" children per episode and five characters: Jumpy, Mr. Bump, Miss Warble, Professor Blinky, and L.Z. Bones. 

Jumpy, a green and blue monkey, serves as Mary Lou's energetic sidekick. Mr. Bump, a clumsy yet charming delivery-man, rides around on a noisy bike with a box full of interesting packages. Miss Warble, the singing custodian, constantly keeps watch over the cleanliness of the Flip Flop Shop. Professor Blinky, an owl puppet, never fails to share wise proverbs and stories with the members of the Flip Flop Shop. L.Z. Bones is a sloth/Wookie hybrid who always tries to get out of physical activity and must be persuaded by the others to get up and join in the fun. 

The show was produced by Y&R Productions, Ltd. KUHT Houston and was shown in 2001 on PBS affiliates. In 2008, the program was added to FamilyNet's Saturday morning children's program block.

Cast 
Cast members include:
Mary Lou Retton as herself
Luci Christian as Jumpy
Ralph Ehntholt as Mr. Bump
Jeffrey S. Lane as L.Z. Bones
Claude Sims as L.Z. Bones Voice
Paula Nielsen as Miss Warble
Scott Young as Mouse
Marijane Vandivier as Professor Blinky
Alicia Church as Fruit Lady
Chelsea Ricketts
Connor Konz
Shelbie Bruce
Gabi Chennisi
Mary Moon
Jimmy Moon
Mary Moran
Lauryn Story
Jace Metzler
Blake Goodwine
Evan McMillan
Vincent Ortiz
Andrew Engle

Episodes 
The episodes produced for the Mary Lou's Flip Flop Shop series present and teach important life lessons while encouraging children to lead active, healthy lifestyles through “creative movement.”  The following plot summaries include the title of the Mary Lou's Flip Flop Shop episode and a brief description of each show.

 Feelings
 Insecurity
 Rejection
 Cooperation
 Sharing
 Self Worth
 Friends
 Safety
 Hurry Up
 Disappointment
 Forgiveness
 Acceptance
 Patience

References 
 Mary Lou's Flip Flop Shop
Mary Lou's Flip Flop Shop on HoustonPBS

 

2001 American television series debuts
2000s American children's television series
2000s preschool education television series
American preschool education television series
American television shows featuring puppetry
Exercise television shows
PBS Kids shows
PBS original programming
Television series about children
Television series about monkeys